Kankakee Township is one of seventeen townships in Kankakee County, Illinois, USA.  As of the 2010 census, its population was 27,558 and it contained 11,219 housing units.  This township has the smallest area in the county, but is second largest in population.

History
Kankakee Township was formed from a portion of Bourbonnais Township on March 12, 1855.

Geography

Cities, towns, villages
 Kankakee (northeast three-quarters)

Unincorporated towns
 West Kankakee at 
(This list is based on USGS data and may include former settlements.)

Adjacent townships
 Bourbonnais Township (north)
 Aroma Township (east)
 Ganeer Township (east)
 Otto Township (southwest)
 Limestone Township (west)

Cemeteries
The township contains these four cemeteries: Mound Grove, Mount Calvary, Old State Hospital and State Hospital.

Major highways
  Interstate 57
  U.S. Route 45
  Illinois Route 17
  Illinois Route 50

Airports and landing strips
 Benoit Airport
 Kankakee Valley Airport (north quarter)
 Riverside Medical Center Heliport
 Saint Marys Hospital Heliport

Rivers
 Iroquois River
 Kankakee River

Demographics

Government
The township is governed by an elected Town Board of a Supervisor and four Trustees.  The Township also has an elected Assessor, Clerk, Highway Commissioner and Supervisor.  The Township Office is located at 187 South Schuyler Avenue, Suite 410, Kankakee, IL 60901.

Political districts
 Illinois's 11th congressional district
 State House District 79
 State Senate District 40

School districts
 Herscher Community Unit School District 2
 Kankakee School District 111

References
 
 United States Census Bureau 2007 TIGER/Line Shapefiles
 United States National Atlas

External links
 Kankakee County Official Site
 City-Data.com
 Illinois State Archives

Townships in Kankakee County, Illinois
1855 establishments in Illinois
Townships in Illinois